David Diamond (1900–1979) was an American film producer.

Select credits
She Gets Her Man (1935)
The Raven (1935)
The Affair of Susan (1935)
Swing It, Sailor! (1938)
A Modern Marriage (1950)
I Was an American Spy (1951)
A Bullet for Joey (1954)
The Phenix City Story (1955)
Screaming Eagles (1955)
Revolt in the Big House (1958)
Operation Eichman (1961)
The Big Bankroll (1961)
Frigid Wife (1962)
The Strangler (1964)

References

External links

1900 births
1979 deaths
American film producers